The Lost Breed Motorcycle Club was an outlaw motorcycle club in Nelson, New Zealand, formed in 1976.
From that time on and up until their dissolution, they were essentially the only gang in the town and repelled attempts by other gangs (including the Highway 61 MC and the Fourth Reich a violent neo-Nazi gang) to set up. The club announced that they were strongly opposed to the drug P (Meth) and domestic violence although police consider these claims to be dubious.

At the end of 2015, the group was "shut down" by the Hells Angels with some members patching over to a Hells Angels chapter established in the city.

See also
 Gangs in New Zealand
List of gangs in New Zealand
 List of outlaw motorcycle clubs

References

Gangs in New Zealand
Nelson, New Zealand
Outlaw motorcycle clubs
Motorcycle clubs in New Zealand